Hernando de Alvarado (d. 1540s), was a Spanish conquistador and explorer, lieutenant under Francisco Vázquez de Coronado. In 1540s Coronado expedition into the American Southwest on August 29 1540 Hernando leading small military unit came upon Acoma Pueblo.

References

Spanish explorers of North America
Spanish conquistadors
1540s deaths